Klaus Heidegger (born 19 August 1957) is an Austrian former alpine skier.

Career
He had five victories on the FIS World Cup circuit. These were the giant slalom at Garmisch-Partenkirchen, the slalom at Furano, and the giant slalom at Voss, all in 1977, and the slalom events at Wengen and Kitzbühel, both in 1978. Heidegger finished second overall in the 1977 World Cup standings, behind Ingemar Stenmark of Sweden.

Following his skiing career, Heidegger has served as co-president of the American cosmetic company Kiehl's, which was sold to L'Oreal for an estimated price of $100 million to $150 million in 2000. Klaus Heidegger is also a co-founder of Masai Group International, provider of MBT Physiological Footwear, which received an investment from Berkshire Partners in 2007.

Heidegger is married to Jami Morse Heidegger. His son Max is a professional basketball player in the Israeli Basketball Premier League.

References

External links
 
 

1957 births
Living people
Austrian male alpine skiers